Pyronia bathseba, the Spanish gatekeeper, is a butterfly of the family Nymphalidae. It is found on the Iberian Peninsula and in France, Morocco, and Algeria.  A similar gatekeeper species is Pyronia tithonus, which is found in northern Europe.

Description 
The wingspan is 18–19 mm. The butterfly is on wing from May to July depending on the location.

Biology 
The larvae feed on Poaceae species, mainly Brachypodium species.

References

External links

Satyrinae of the Western Palearctic
Butterflies of Europe

Pyronia
Butterflies of Europe
Butterflies described in 1793